Syson is a surname. People with the surname include:

Antonia Syson (1973-2018), British-American classical scholar specialising in the study of Virgil's Aeneid
Alfred Syson (1880–1952), British fencer who competed in the 1912 Summer Olympics
Lucinda Syson, nominee for the 2006 Artios Award for Outstanding Achievement in Casting – Big Budget Feature (Drama)
Luke Syson (fl. 1990s–2020s), director of the Fitzwilliam Museum
Sidney Syson, winner in the 2019 Warwick District Council election